Dolichupis is a genus of small sea snails, marine gastropod mollusks in the family Triviidae, the false cowries or trivias.

Species
Species within the genus Dolichupis include:
 Dolichupis acutidentata (Gaskoin, 1836)
 Dolichupis akangus Simone & Cunha, 2012
 Dolichupis artema (C. N. Cate, 1979)
 Dolichupis burius (C. N. Cate, 1979)
 Dolichupis cicatrosa (G. B. Sowerby II, 1870)
 Dolichupis citeria (C. N. Cate, 1979)
 † Dolichupis clypeus Dolin, 1991 
Dolichupis derkai Fehse & Grego, 2002
 Dolichupis dorsennus (C. N. Cate, 1979)
 Dolichupis halians (C. N. Cate, 1979)
 Dolichupis iota (C. N. Cate, 1979)
Dolichupis janae (Lorenz, 2001)
 Dolichupis leei Fehse & Grego, 2010
Dolichupis leucosphaera (Schilder, 1931)
Dolichupis malvabasis Dolin, 2001
 Dolichupis mediagibber Fehse & Grego, 2010
 Dolichupis meridionalis (C. N. Cate, 1979)
 Dolichupis myrae (G. B. Campbell, 1961)
 Dolichupis panamensis (Dall, 1902)
 Dolichupis paucilirata (G. B. Sowerby II, 1870)
 Dolichupis pingius Simone & Cunha, 2012
Dolichupis producta (Gaskoin, 1836)
 Dolichupis ritteri (Raymond, 1903)
 Dolichupis rubinicolor (Gaskoin, 1836)
 Dolichupis tindigei Fehse & Grego, 2010
 Dolichupis vemacola (Liltved, 1987)
Dolichupis virgo Fehse & Grego, 2005
Species brought into synonymy
 Dolichupis pulloidea (Dall & Ochsner, 1928): synonym of Pseudopusula galapagensis (Melvill, 1900)

References

 Fehse D. (2002) Beiträge zur Kenntnis der Triviidae (Mollusca: Gastropoda) V. Kritische Beurteilung der Genera und Beschreibung einer neuen Art der Gattung Semitrivia Cossmann, 1903. Acta Conchyliorum 6: 3-48.
 Simone, L. R. & Cunha, C. M., 2012. Taxonomic study on the molluscs collected in Marion-Dufresne expedition (MD55) to SE Brazil: Xenophoridae, Cypraeoidea, mitriforms and Terebridae (Caenogastropoda). Zoosystema 34(4): 745-781

External links
 Iredale, T. (1930). Queensland molluscan notes, No. 2. Memoirs of the Queensland Museum. 10(1): 73-88, pl. 9

Triviidae
Gastropod genera